In baseball, innings pitched (IP) are the number of innings a pitcher has completed, measured by the number of batters and baserunners that are put out while the pitcher is on the pitching mound in a game.  Three outs made is equal to one inning pitched.  One out counts as one-third of an inning, and two outs counts as two-thirds of an inning.

This is a list of the top 100 Major League Baseball pitchers who have accumulated the most innings pitched of all time.

Cy Young is the all-time leader in innings pitched with 7,356, and the only pitcher to throw more than 7,000 innings. Pud Gavin is the only other pitcher in MLB history to throw more than 6,000 innings.

Key

List

See also

List of Major League Baseball career games started leaders
List of Major League Baseball career wins leaders

References
Baseball-Reference

Innings Pitched
Innings pitched
Top sports lists